Charles John "Jake" Schuehle, Jr. (September 28, 1917 – January 8, 2001) was an American football halfback who played for the Philadelphia Eagles of the National Football League (NFL) for one season in 1939.  He played college football for Rice and he was drafted by the Eagles in the sixth round of the 1939 NFL Draft.

References

1917 births
2001 deaths
American football halfbacks
Rice Owls football players
Philadelphia Eagles players
Players of American football from Texas
People from Hondo, Texas